Hunan Nonferrous Metals Holding Group Co., Ltd. is a nonferrous metals company of China. It is a subsidiary of China Minmetals, which in turn indirectly under supervision of State-owned Assets Supervision and Administration Commission.

Some of the assets of the conglomerate was listed in Hong Kong Stock Exchange from 2006 to 2015 as "Hunan Nonferrous Metals Corporation Limited" (SEHK: 2626). (The holding company retained Hunan Yaogangxian Mining Co., Ltd., Hunan Huangshaping Mining Branch and a joint venture (Duddar mine).) However, in 2014 China Minmetals announced the plan to privatization of the listed company, which China Minmetals already took control of the holding company "Hunan Nonferrous Metals Holding Group Co., Ltd." in 2011.

On 1 August 2006 it purchased a 9.73 percent share in Compass Resources NL of Australia for 30 million Australian dollars.

References 

Government-owned companies of China
Metal companies of China
Companies based in Hunan
Non-renewable resource companies established in 2004
Chinese companies established in 2004
2004 establishments in China